In June 2020, Ahmad Erekat was shot and killed by Israeli police after his car collided with a checkpoint in the West Bank near Abu Dis. CCTV footage was published, showing Erekat exiting the vehicle after he had hit a group of officers and lightly injuring one of them, and walking backwards away from the police with his hands in the air, and then being shot several times. Erekat was a nephew of Saeb Erekat and a cousin of Noura Erekat and YouTuber FouseyTube.

The Israeli officers justified their actions as self-defense, saying that Erekat attempted to ram his car into them, and hit a female officer who was knocked down. A later statement from Israeli sources said that evidence "provided a foundation for the [conclusion] that a deliberate car attack was carried out. In addition, findings in Erekat’s mobile phone reinforced the conclusion that a deliberate attack took place." The same statement stated that "Erekat emerged [from the vehicle], [moving] quickly toward Border Police fighters while waving his hands in a manner taken as threatening"; however, according to Sky News and Haaretz, footage shows him walking backwards with his hands up.

Forensic Architecture and Al-Haq launched an investigation into the killing using 3D modeling, fieldwork, geolocation, synchronization, OSINT, and shadow analysis, and concluded that the car's collision with the checkpoint was an accident, that the Israeli shooting constituted an extrajudicial killing and excessive use of lethal force, and that the Israeli military had denied Erekat urgent medical care.
A joint statement by the Foreign Ministry, the Shin Bet security service, the IDF and the Defense Ministry denies this and states that Erekat was examined by medical personnel shortly after being shot, and pronounced dead on the scene as he had no pulse and was not breathing.

References

2020 deaths
Deaths by firearm in the West Bank
Deaths by person in Asia
21st-century controversies
People from the West Bank